Lambert v. California, 355 U.S. 225 (1957), was a United States Supreme Court case regarding the defense of ignorance of the law when there is no legal notice. The court held that, when one is required to register one's presence, failure to register may only be punished when there is a probability that the accused party had knowledge of the law before committing the crime of failing to register.

Circumstances
Lambert had previously been convicted of forgery, a felony in California. She was unaware that a Los Angeles city ordinance required that she, being a felon, register if she remained in the city for more than five days. The ordinance stipulated that she, as a convicted criminal, could be fined $500 and sentenced to up to six months in jail for every day she remained in the city after the five-day limit. When she was arrested on suspicion of committing another offense she was convicted for failure to register. As Lambert was not allowed to use her lack of knowledge as a defense, she was convicted, fined $250 and sentenced to three years probation. Lambert appealed her case,  arguing that she had no knowledge that she had to register her name and  that convicting her would deprive her of due process under the Fourteenth Amendment.

Decision
The Supreme Court reversed Lambert's conviction,  holding that knowledge or probability of knowledge of a statute is required to convict someone of a notice offense. Justice William Douglas, who delivered the majority opinion for the court, wrote:

However, the court did not overturn the right of states and municipalities to force occupants to register for a given purpose. The court held that because the ordinance that forced convicted felons to register was not accompanied by any action, nor were there circumstances that would lead a felon to be aware of his or her duty to register, the ordinance was unconstitutional. The Justice continued:

Significance
This case is an exception to the legal principle ignorantia legis non excusat—that the ignorance of the law is not a suitable excuse for breaking it. Because it deals with the motives (or lack thereof) for committing a crime, it addresses mens rea, the degree of legal culpability that arises from the motivation of a criminal.

See also
List of United States Supreme Court cases, volume 355

References

Further reading

External links
 

United States Supreme Court cases
United States Supreme Court cases of the Warren Court
United States due process case law
1957 in United States case law
1957 in California
Legal history of California
History of Los Angeles
Ignorance